The Chickasha Formation is a geologic formation in Oklahoma. It preserves fossils dating back to the Roadian stage of the Middle Permian.

See also

 List of fossiliferous stratigraphic units in Oklahoma
 Paleontology in Oklahoma

References

 

Permian geology of Oklahoma